De Press is a Polish-Norwegian rock band founded in Oslo in 1980. They were among the leading Norwegian new wave bands, and also gained a following in Poland.

History 
The original De Press had the following line-up: 
Andrej Nebb (Andrzej Dziubek) - vocals and bass
Jørn Christensen - guitar
Ola Snortheim - drums and percussion

They recorded their first album in 1981 with the title Block to Block. The original De Press disbanded in 1981, but also recorded an album in 1982. They reunited in 1991. By 1995, Nebb was the only remaining original member. With various line-ups, Nebb's De Press still tour and release records in Poland.

Between 2007 and 2011 De Press reformed with the following line-up:
Andrej Nebb - vocals
Darek Budkiewicz - bass 
Tomasz Fudala - guitar (Vacation)
Łukasz Gocal - drums (Vacation)

Discography

Albums
 Block to Block (1981)
 Product (1982)
 On the Other Side (live, 1983)
 The Ballshov Trio (1991)
 3 Potocki (1991)
 Vodka Party (1993)
 Groj skrzypko groj (1994)
 Potargano chałpa (1997)
 Dwie tęsknoty (1998)
 deFinite (2CD, 2000)
 Śleboda (2000)
 Russian Party (2001)
 Cy bocycie Świnty Ojce (2002)
 Lars Hertevig/On the Other Side (re-issue, 2005)
 Rekyl (2006)
 Zre Nas Konsumpcja (2008)
 Kolędy (2008)
 Myśmy Rebelianci (2009)
 Norwid: Gromy i pyłki (2010)
 Amen (2011)
 Sex spod Tater (2013)

Singles
Pond (1980)
Lars Hertevig (1981)
In a Crowded Room (1982)
East Block 2-Step (1991)
Pust Wiesegda  (2005)
Żre nas Konsumpcja (2008)
Elektryczny baca  (2008)
Katyń/Smoleńsk  (2010)

External links

 

Norwegian new wave musical groups
Norwegian alternative rock groups
Polish new wave musical groups
Polish alternative rock groups
Musical groups established in 1980
1980 establishments in Norway
Musical groups disestablished in 1981
1981 disestablishments in Norway
Musical groups reestablished in 1991
Musical groups from Oslo
Norwegian rock music groups